Tian Xing Jian (Chinese mandarin 天行健) is a 2011 Chinese war fiction political television series starring Winston Chao about the Xinhua University history from the building in 1904 to the first opening in 1911 to the Japanese invasion of China from 1937 to 1945 and how it still remain today. The series was made to honor the Xinhua University 100th anniversary but was only aired one season.

Synopsis 

Professor Zhou Zixuan and his master travel to America to discuss an international university to be built in Beijing where foreign and Chinese students can co work. But after a civil war that broke out in China during 1904 the Americans are not sure if China are qualified to have an multi University in case of risk, Zhou manage to convince that China is now a peaceful country and manage to get and approval of Xinhua University in 1911. But then came the first sino-japanese war and put the country at risk. The Americans want to put down the University but Zhou will do everything ask he can to protect his University. Then 2nd world war happened and Xinhua is in middle of it.

Cast 
Winston Chao as Zhou Zixuan
Johan Karlberg as Counsil Man
Feihu Sun as Liang Cheng
Xun Sun as Mei Yiqi
Yang Zhao as Sicheng

References

External links 

2011 Chinese television series debuts
2010s Chinese television series
Chinese action television series
Chinese-language television shows